Chirnogi is a commune in Călărași County, Muntenia, Romania. It is composed of a single village, Chirnogi.

References

External links 
 Gumelnița Culture graves (5th millennium BC) discovered at Chirnogi

Chirnogi
Localities in Muntenia